Anna Wickham was the pseudonym of Edith Alice Mary Harper (1883 – 1947), an English/Australian poet who was a pioneer of modernist poetry, and one of the most important female poets writing during the first half of the twentieth century. She was friend to other important writers of the time, such as D. H. Lawrence, George Bernard Shaw, Katherine Mansfield and Dylan Thomas. Wickham lived a transnational, unconventional life, moving between Australia, England and France. She is remembered as a modernist figure and feminist writer, although one who did not command sustained critical attention in her lifetime, although her poetry did earn her a major reputation at the time of writing and had been frequently anthologised. Her literary reputation has improved since her death and she is now regarded as an important early 20th-century woman writer.

Early life
She was born in Wimbledon, London, and brought up in Australia, mostly in Brisbane and Sydney. Her pen-names imply an Australian self-identification: "Wickham" was adopted after a Brisbane street. She had used "John Oland" for her first collection, which alludes to the Jenolan Caves in New South Wales.

Wickham returned to London in 1904, where she took singing lessons and won a drama scholarship (at the future RADA, just founded). She pursued her singing in Paris in 1905 with Jean de Reszke, the Polish tenor.

In 1906 she married Patrick Hepburn, a City of London solicitor with interests in Romanesque architecture, and later astronomy. They had four sons. They lived first in central London, then in family houses in Hampstead: Downshire Hill, from 1909, and then from 1919 a house on Parliament Hill which would be her permanent home.

She became involved in the contemporary philanthropic movement concerned with maternal care, at St Pancras Hospital.

Career and strife
Her first collection, Songs by John Oland, was published in 1911, and had a particular focus on the conflict between men and women, depicted in such poems as "Song of the Low-Caste Wife", "Surrender" and "Divorce". Other subjects included the ambition to be a writer, a post-Darwin loss of religious faith, and motherhood. Her husband was angered at her publishing a book, and subsequently also captured the interest of one of his friends in his astronomical circles. He was known to be possessive, and generally unsupportive of her singing and writing, which may have been a major factor leading to her breakdown and psychiatric hospitalisation.

She was in a private psychiatric hospital in 1911 for a period of about six weeks. In her autobiographical writing she represented this occurrence as related to her husband's hostility to her writing of poetry. It followed a violent quarrel. Given the complexities of her emotional life at the time, post-natal (with two miscarriages) and in relation to parental conflicts, there would have been other factors at play, but this kind of hostility was not unusual towards pioneering women writers of the time.

Shortly afterwards, she met Harold Monro at his Poetry Bookshop. He encouraged her writing, and she published a second collection in 1915. This was the effective start of thirty years during which she mixed with literati in London (and later in Paris). She carried on a bohemian lifestyle, in parallel with the home life she often felt so hindered by.

During World War I Patrick Hepburn spent time away from home, joining the RNAS. During this time, Anna struck up a friendship with D. H. Lawrence and his wife Frieda. She also knew H. D., with whom she had had a brief affair, although that was one of several contacts which apparently failed in sympathy. Her relations with the novelist Eliot Bliss are said to have been intimate.

Her third son Richard died of scarlet fever aged four. She spent a period in the early 1920s in Paris, after his death, to recuperate. There she developed a passion for Natalie Barney. It was not returned in the same way, but they sustained a correspondence (later published as Postcards and Poems). She met some leading Paris figures in anglophone modernism of the time.

It is believed that her marriage was in crisis during 1926, and she was separated from her husband until 1928. He died in an accident, on holiday, in 1929.

During the 1930s she was well known in literary London, and wrote a great deal of poetry (much of which was later lost in war damage) and much of which remained unpublished. She did find support from the somewhat louche John Gawsworth, who in 1936 put out a Richards Press collection of her work. An extended autobiographical essay Prelude to a Spring Clean dates from 1935. That was the year in which she supported the just-married Dylan Thomas and Caitlin, and then quarrelled with them.

She committed suicide during the winter of 1947.

Works
Songs of John Oland (1911)
The Contemplative Quarry (1915)
The Man With A Hammer (1916) 
The Little Old House 1921
Anna Wickham: Richards' Shilling Selections from Edwardian Poets (1936, Richards Press) 
Selected Poems (1971)
The Writings of Anna Wickham: Free Woman and Poet (1984), edited by R. D. Smith, includes "Prelude to a Spring Clean".

References

Sources
A New Matrix for Modernism: A Study of the Lives and Poetry of Charlotte Mew and Anna Wickham (2002), Nelljean McConeghey Rice 
Anna Wickham: A Poet's Daring Life (2003), Jennifer Vaughan Jones

External links
 
AustLit Author Entry

1880s births
1947 suicides
English women poets
English emigrants to Australia
20th-century English poets
20th-century English women writers
1947 deaths